The Brazilian 2010 Census was the twelfth and, the most recent census of Brazil, organized by the Brazilian Institute of Geography and Statistics (IBGE), with the reference date being August 1, 2010. The population was found to be a record 190,755,799, an increase of 12.5%. The population aged, with the median age now being 29, compared to 25 in 2000. The next census is to take place on August 1, 2022, after two cancelations, one to the COVID-19 pandemic, and the other due to budgetary restraints.

Federal units' and regions' population

Federal Units

Regions

Race and religion 

The census found that the composition of Brazil was as follows: 47.5% were White, 43.4% were Pardo (Mixed-Race), 7.5% were Black, 1.1% were East Asian (Yellow in the census), 0.4% were Indigenous and 0.01% did not answer. 

The census also asked people their religion: 64.6% were Catholics, 22.2% were Protestants, 8% had no religion, 2% followed Spiritism and 3.2% followed other religions.

See also 
 Demographics of Brazil

References

Brazil
Censuses in Brazil